Pembecik  is a  village in Aydıncık district of Mersin Province, Turkey. The village is situated in the Taurus Mountains. The population of the Pembecik was 437 as of 2012. Main agricultural products of the village are greenhouse vegetables.

References

Villages in Aydıncık District (Mersin)